Emeric Arus (9 June 1938 – 10 October 2022) was a Romanian fencer. He competed in the individual and team sabre events at the 1960 Summer Olympics.

Arus died on 10 October 2022, at the age of 84.

References

External links
 

1938 births
2022 deaths
Romanian male sabre fencers
Olympic fencers of Romania
Fencers at the 1960 Summer Olympics
Sportspeople from Oradea
Romanian expatriates in the United States